Albury is a city in New South Wales, Australia.

Albury may also refer to:

Places
Electoral district of Albury, an electoral district in the New South Wales Legislative Assembly
Albury, Hertfordshire, England
Albury, Ontario, Canada
Albury, Oxfordshire, England
Albury, Surrey, England
Albury Park, Surrey, England
Albury, New Zealand
Albury End, Hertfordshire, England
Albury Heath, Surrey, England

Other uses
Albury (surname)

See also
 Aldbury